Symplectoscyphidae is a family of cnidarians in the order Leptothecata.

Genera
Antarctoscyphus Peña Cantero, Garcia Carrascosa & Vervoort, 1997
Symplectoscyphus Marktanner-Turneretscher, 1890

References

Leptothecata
Cnidarian families